Allens Grove Township may refer to the following townships in the United States:

 Allens Grove Township, Mason County, Illinois
 Allens Grove Township, Scott County, Iowa